Two Little Drummer Boys is a 1928 British silent comedy film directed by G. B. Samuelson and starring Georgie Wood, Derrick De Marney and Alma Taylor. The film was based on the 1899 play Two Little Drummer Boys by Walter Howard and was shot at Southall Studios. It was produced by a forerunner of Mancunian Films.

Cast
 Georgie Wood as Eric Carsdale
 Derrick De Marney as Jack Carsdale
 Alma Taylor as Alma Carsdale
 Paul Cavanagh as Captain Darrell
 Walter Byron as Captain Carsdale
 Julie Suedo as Margaret

References

Bibliography
 Wagg, Stephen. Because I tell a Joke or Two: Comedy, Politics and Social Difference. Routledge, 1998.

External links

1928 films
British silent feature films
1928 comedy films
British comedy films
Films directed by G. B. Samuelson
British films based on plays
Films shot at Southall Studios
British black-and-white films
Films shot in Greater Manchester
1920s English-language films
1920s British films
Silent comedy films